= James Wolff =

Pseudonym of a British author

James Wolff is the pseudonym of a British author and former intelligence officer. He writes spy novels.

== Books ==
- Spies and Other Gods (2026)
- The Man in the Corduroy Suit (2023, ISBN 978-1913394851)
- How to Betray Your Country (2021)
- Beside the Syrian Sea (2018)
